George Clarence Tomer (November 26, 1895 – December 15, 1984) was an American Major League Baseball player who pinch hit for the St. Louis Browns in . Tomer had a 13-year Minor League career following his one Major League game. He was also a player-manager for the Kalamazoo Celery Pickers and the Marshalltown Ansons.

References

St. Louis Browns players
Henderson Hens players
Cedar Rapids Rabbits players
Kinston Eagles players
Fort Dodge Dodgers players
Kalamazoo Celery Pickers players
Springfield Ponies players
Bay City Wolves players
York White Roses players
Marshalltown Ansons players
Winston-Salem Twins players
Baseball players from Iowa
1895 births
1984 deaths
People from Perry, Iowa